The Bella Union was a saloon and theater that opened on September 10, 1876, in Deadwood, South Dakota. The proprietor was Tom Miller, an aggressive businessman who would buy several neighboring properties as well. 

Bella Union Saloon was a relatively upscale establishment where town meetings came to be held.

In November 1878, Tom Miller went bankrupt, and the Bella Union became a grocery store downstairs and a meeting hall named Mechanics' Hall upstairs.

In popular culture
A fictionalized version of the saloon appeared in the HBO television series Deadwood (2004-2006), where the owner was the character Cy Tolliver. In Deadwood: The Movie (2019), which is set ten years after the third and final season of the television series, Tolliver has since died, and the saloon is now owned and run by its former madam Joanie Stubbs. In the musical, Calamity Jane (1953), the character Henry Miller (not Tom), is the proprietor of the town's saloon and theater.

References 

Drinking establishments in South Dakota
Buildings and structures in Deadwood, South Dakota
1876 establishments in Dakota Territory
Theatres completed in 1876